Roderick Henri Babers (born October 6, 1980) is a former American football cornerback who played in the National Football League. He was drafted by the New York Giants in the fourth round of the 2003 NFL Draft. He played college football at Texas.

Babers was also a member of the Detroit Lions, Chicago Bears, Tampa Bay Buccaneers, Denver Broncos and Hamilton Tiger-Cats.

Babers is now a sports radio talk show host on "RBKD" with Kevin Dunn, a program that airs weekdays from 3:00-7:00 pm on 104.9 The Horn KTXX-FM in Austin, Texas. Babers also co-hosts "Longhorn Blitz" with Jeff Howe and Matt Butler.

External links
CFL bio
Detroit Lions bio

1980 births
Living people
American football cornerbacks
Texas Longhorns football players
New York Giants players
Detroit Lions players
Tampa Bay Buccaneers players
Denver Broncos players
Chicago Bears players
Austin Wranglers players
Hamilton Tiger-Cats players
Players of American football from Houston
Players of Canadian football from Houston